Pati Patni Aur Woh is a 2019 Indian Hindi language romantic comedy film written and directed by Mudassar Aziz. A remake of the 1978 film of the same name, the film stars Kartik Aaryan, Bhumi Pednekar and Ananya Panday. Principal photography commenced in February 2019.

Plot 
Abhinav "Chintu" Kumar Tyagi is an ordinary middle-class man from Kanpur, and a government engineer in the Public Works Department (PWD). He has been married to Vedika Tripathi, a physics teacher from Lucknow. Chintu is happy but is harassed by his controlling parents for not planning a child, and by Vedika, who wants to move to a big city.

Bored in his day-to-day life, Chintu finds comfort in Tapasya Singh, an aspiring fashion designer from Delhi, who is related to his boss and came to select a plot for starting her fashion business. Tapasya is much more attractive than Vedika. Chintu finds himself drawn toward her and decides to enjoy his life. He lies to her that Vedika is having an affair with Rakesh Yadav, who is actually a student in her class besotted with her.

Chintu goes on dates with Tapasya and though he tries to avoid Vedika, she finally sees the two of them together one day. However, she keeps the secret of his infidelity to herself and listens as he lies to her. Vedika attends her cousin Kanupriya's wedding, where she meets ex-boyfriend Durgesh "Doga" Kanojia, a local bad boy whom she had left for Chintu. The two resolve to leave the country and shift to Canada. Meanwhile, Chintu goes to Tapasya's home in Delhi and meets her friends. They go to a nightclub and party; she seduces a drunken Chintu and is ready to kiss him, but Chintu is held by his conscience.

Chintu realises he has wronged Vedika, but it is too late, as she tells him she is leaving him and knows of his infidelity. Chintu realises how much he loves her. Distraught, he visits Vedika's parents with his best friend Fahim, but her parents give them her letter, wherein she states that she is eloping with Doga. At Doga's travel agency, Chintu and Fahim are roughed up by Doga's henchmen. When he visits Tapasya at her home and warns her that she cannot take Vedika's place, she asks him why he chooses to remain unhappy when she is there for him. Working himself up in a fit of rage while drunk, he smashes Doga's shop and is arrested but Fahim pays for his bail.

One morning, Rakesh arrives with Fahim to find a depressed Chintu at home and informs him that Vedika is departing to Canada for good. The three rush to the Lucknow airport, with Chintu's family and police in hot pursuit. At the airport, Chintu finds Vedika, Tapasya and Doga. Tapasya spares him, saying that she will not slap him no matter how much she wants to because he did not get intimate with her while in Delhi. He finds out that it is Doga who is going to Canada and that this was Doga's plan to make him realise Vedika's worth. Vedika forgives him and they reconcile.

Eventually another girl, Neha Khanna, enters his office; he initially stares at her but restrains himself. As she goes out the door, he calls out her name while she calls him a 'weirdo' to herself.

Cast 
Kartik Aaryan as Abhinav "Chintu" Kumar Tyagi
Bhumi Pednekar as Vedika "Guddi" Tripathi Tyagi
Ananya Panday as Tapasya Singh
 Aparshakti Khurana as Fahim Abdul Rizvi
K. K. Raina as Professor Arvind Kumar Tyagi
Rajesh Sharma as Prem Tripathi
 Navni Parihar as Kusum Tyagi
 Geeta Agarwal Sharma as Hemlata Tripathi
 Neeraj Sood as Baldev Raj Pandey / "Mausaji"
 Shubham Kumar as Rakesh Yadav
 Manu Rishi Chaddha as Inspector Mukhtar Singh

Special appearances
 Jimmy Sheirgill as Narrator (Voiceover)
 Sunny Singh as Durgesh "Doga" Verma
 Kriti Sanon as Neha Khanna

Soundtrack

The music is composed by Tanishk Bagchi, Rochak Kohli, Sachet–Parampara, Tony Kakkar and Lijo George – DJ Chetas with, lyrics written by Kumaar, Mellow D, Tony Kakkar, Tanishk Bagchi, Navi Ferozpurwala and Shabbir Ahmed.

Tony Kakkar's song "Dheeme Dheeme", originally released in May 2019, was recreated by Tanishk Bagchi with a party beat and additional vocals from his sister, Neha Kakkar.

The second song "Ankhiyon Se Goli Maare" from the film Dulhe Raja, originally sung by popular singers Sonu Nigam and Jaspinder Narula, composed by Anand–Milind and written by Sameer Anjaan was recreated for the film twice – once by Tanishk Bagchi and then by DJ Chetas.

Box office
The film earned 103.44 crore in whole India and 14.26 crore overseas, for a worldwide collection of 117.70 crore .

Awards

For her performance, Ananya Panday won a Filmfare Award for Best Female Debut in February 2020. Later in 2020, Kartik Aaryan was awarded with the Zee Cine Award for Best Actor in a Comic Role.

References

External links
 
 
 

2019 films
2019 romantic comedy films
Indian romantic comedy films
Films scored by Sachet–Parampara
Films scored by Rochak Kohli
Films scored by Tanishk Bagchi
Films scored by Tony Kakkar
Remakes of Indian films
T-Series (company) films
2010s Hindi-language films
Films set in Kanpur